N-alkylglycine oxidase (N-carboxymethylalkylamine:oxygen oxidoreductase (decarboxymethylating)) is an enzyme with systematic name N-alkylglycine:oxygen oxidoreductase (alkylamine forming). This enzyme catalyses the following chemical reaction

 N-alkylglycine + H2O + O2  alkylamine + glyoxalate + H2O2

Isolated from the mold Cladosporium sp. G-10.

References

External links 
 

EC 1.5.3